Beulah Heights may refer to:
 Beaulieu Heights, London, England
 Beulah Heights, California, former town